Frank Solivan is an American mandolinist, recording artist, composer, and leader of the progressive bluegrass band Dirty Kitchen.

Biography

Early life
Solivan grew up near Modesto, California. His grandmother on his father’s side played mandolin and fiddle, and his father plays the banjo, guitar, bass, and mandolin. His mother’s side of the family included classical violin and cello players. He fell in love with bluegrass music at an early age. Solivan formed his first band, Generation Gap in the late 1980s. They once opened for Ralph Stanley at a California show.

In 1995, at age 18, Solivan moved to Alaska where he sat first chair violin in the University of Alaska’s Symphony Orchestra. and played mandolin in his friend Ginger Boatwright's band. 

In 2002, Solivan recorded his first solo album I Am a Rambler when he temporarily moved to Nashville from Alaska to pursue musical goals. He was assisted by friends such as David Grier, Rob Ickes, and Shad Cobb.

Country Current
In 2003, Solivan auditioned and was offered the electric guitar position in the U.S. Navy, service band Country Current. He played electric guitar in their country band and mandolin and fiddle in their bluegrass band for six years.

In 2006, while in the Navy playing with Country Current, Solivan recorded and released a solo album Selfish Tears.

Dirty Kitchen
After the Navy, Solivan decided to form his own band. Besides Solivan (mandolin), the current lineup of Dirty Kitchen includes Mike Munford (banjo), Chris Luquette (guitar), and Jeremy Middleton (bass).

The band name is a reference to the gourmet meals Solivan prepares for friends and family (and the title of one of Solivan's instrumental songs).

Frank Solivan and Dirty Kitchen have released four studio albums: Frank Solivan & Dirty Kitchen in 2010, On the Edge in 2013 (after signing with Compass Records), and Cold Spell in 2014. and If You Can't Stand the Heat (2019).

Family, Friends & Heroes
Solivan's third solo project Family, Friends & Heroes was released in 2016, and features members of Dirty Kitchen, family members, and John Cowan, Shawn Camp, Jerry Douglas, Sam Bush, Jim Hurst, Megan McCormick, Rob Ickes, and Del McCoury. On "Wayfaring Stranger," Solivan’s mother Lorene (now deceased) sings lead vocals.

Other projects
Solivan has toured with The Earls of Leicester when Tim O'Brien had conflicting commitments.

Solivan built his primary mandolin from scratch at a workshop under the tutelage of luthier Roger Siminoff.

Awards
In 2014, The album Cold Spell by Frank & Dirty Kitchen was nominated for a Grammy award in the Bluegrass Album category.

In 2013, Mike Munford was voted Banjo Player of the Year by the IBMA, and guitarist Chris Luquette received the Momentum Award for Performance Instrumentalist.

In 2014 Dirty Kitchen received four IBMA award recognitions: 
 Frank Solivan was nominated for Male Vocalist of the Year and Mandolin Player of the Year
 Mike Munford was nominated for Banjo Player of the Year
 Frank Solivan & Dirty Kitchen won Instrumental Group of the Year award

In 2016, Frank Solivan & Dirty Kitchen were again the IBMA Instrumental Group of the Year.

In 2019, The album If You Can't Stand The Heat by Frank & Dirty Kitchen was nominated for a Grammy award in the Bluegrass Album category.

Discography

Solo albums
 2002: I am a Rambler (Fiddlemon) as Frank Solivan II
 2006: Selfish Tears (Fiddlemon) as Frank Solivan II
 2016: Family, Friends & Heroes (Compass)

As a member of Frank Solivan and Dirty Kitchen
 2010: Frank Solivan & Dirty Kitchen (Fiddlemon)
 2013: On The Edge (Compass)
 2014: Cold Spell (Compass)
 2019: If You Can't Stand the Heat (Compass)

Also appears on
 2005: Gordon_Titcomb [The Last Train Gordon_Titcomb Rising Son Records
 2007: Bill Emerson - Bill Emerson and the Sweet Dixie Band (Rebel)
 2014: John Cowan - Sixty (Compass) - vocals on track 6, "Rising From The Ashes"

References

External links 
 
 
 
 
 

1977 births
American bluegrass musicians
American mandolinists
American bluegrass mandolinists
Living people